Douzillac is a former railway station in Douzillac, Nouvelle-Aquitaine, France. The station is located on the Coutras - Tulle railway line. The station was served by TER (local) services operated by SNCF between Bordeaux and Périgueux. The station was served by 2 trains per day in each direction. It was closed in 2017.

References

Railway stations in France opened in 1882
Defunct railway stations in Dordogne